Ensar "Điđi" Bajramlić (born 16 February 1997) is a Serbian football midfielder who plays for Singapore Premier League side Balestier Khalsa FC.

Career

Novi Pazar
As one of the most perspective players of Novi Pazar youth team, Bajramlić joined the first team squad in summer 2015. He made his Serbian SuperLiga debut in the fixture of for the 2015–16 season, in away match against Metalac Gornji Milanovac, played on 21 May 2016, when he replaced Dino Šarac in 85 minute of that match.

Balstier Khalsa
He joined Balestier Khalsa FC of Singapore for the 2020 Singapore Premier League season. Bajramlić made his debut for the Tigers in a narrow 1–0 defeat to Tampines Rovers in their season opener, where he could have snatched a point for his team in the dying minutes of the game.

References

External links

1997 births
Living people
Sportspeople from Novi Pazar
Association football midfielders
Serbian footballers
FK Novi Pazar players
Serbian SuperLiga players